The Libya national handball team represents the country in the international handball competitions and it is controlled by the Libyan Handball Federation that is one of the African Handball Confederation members and the International Handball Federation as well.

African Championship record

External links
IHF profile

Men's national handball teams
National sports teams of Libya